Louis Paul Jonas (July 17, 1894 – February 16, 1971) was an American sculptor of wildlife, taxidermist, and natural history exhibit designer.

Born in Budapest, Hungary, Jonas moved to the United States at the age of 12 and went to work at his brothers' taxidermy studio, Jonas Brothers, in Denver, Co.  Later he moved to New York City, where he studied under Carl Akeley, a noted field naturalist, taxidermist, and animal sculptor.  There, they created the African elephant group in the center of Akeley Hall at the American Museum of Natural History, in New York.

Jonas opened Louis Paul Jonas Studios, Inc in Mahopac, NY, and eventually moved to Hudson, NY.  The studio was known for its miniature and full size animal sculptures, taxidermy, and natural history exhibits featured in over 50 museums worldwide.

The company created the first full sized dinosaur sculptures for the 1964 New York World's Fair in the "Dinoland" area, which was sponsored by the Sinclair Oil Corporation. Jonas consulted with noted paleontologists Barnum Brown, Edwin H. Colbert and John Ostrom in order to create sculptures that were as accurate as possible. After the Fair closed, the dinosaur models toured the country on special flatbed trailers as part of a company advertising campaign. Many of the statues are now on display at various museums and parks

Sculptures on display
In 1932, Louis Paul Jonas and his brothers created the taxidermy model of the famous Australian race horse Phar Lap that is now on display at the Melbourne Museum.

In 1983, the National Museum of Natural History in Washington, D.C. hosted an exhibition of 75 wildlife miniatures created by Jonas.

Dinosaurs

Life-sized fiberglass models of dinosaurs created by Jonas Studios for the 1964 New York World's Fair are on display at:
 The Houston Museum of Natural Science houses a life-sized ankylosaurus statue.
 Dinosaur Valley State Park in Glen Rose, Texas features the tyrannosaurus rex and brontosaurus models.
 The Quarry Visitor Center at Dinosaur National Monument in Jensen, Utah features a stegosaurus statue. 
 The Milwaukee Public Museum houses a struthiomimus statue in its The Third Planet dinosaur display. 
 The Brookfield Zoo in Brookfield, Illinois includes a trachodon sculpture.
 "Uncle Beazley", a model of a triceratops that Jonas designed and constructed for the 1964 New York World's Fair and that appeared in The Enormous Egg television movie in 1968, is on display at the National Zoo in Washington, D.C. From the 1970s to 1994, the statue was located on the National Mall in front of the National Museum of Natural History. (Some sources state that the Kentucky Science Center in Louisville (formerly named the "Louisville Museum of Natural History and Science" and the "Louisville Science Center") now owns the triceratops model).

A Jonas Studios sculpture of a stegosaurus, "Steggie II", is located in front of the Cleveland Museum of Natural History. Another copy, known as "Wally", is located at the Berkshire Museum in Pittsfield, Massachusetts. Still another is on display at the Fernbank Museum of Natural History in Atlanta.

References

External links
 Jonas Studios

20th-century American sculptors
20th-century American male artists
American male sculptors
Animal artists
1894 births
1971 deaths
Taxidermists
Austro-Hungarian emigrants to the United States
American military personnel of World War I
20th-century American painters
American male painters